was a Japanese politician before and during World War II. His wife was the daughter of Prince Takeda Tsunehisa.

Biography
Arima was born in Tokyo as a son of the former daimyō of Kurume Domain (now part of Fukuoka Prefecture). He studied agricultural science at the Tokyo Imperial University, and later became a professor there.

He read Karl Marx and Max Stirner, and other radical philosophers, and became attracted to the agrarian movement and radical political ideas. Arima founded the Nihon Nomin Kumiai (Japan Farmer's Union) together with Kagawa Toyohiko. He was active in various social programmes, including the establishment and support of night school, women's education, farmer's rights, and the rights of the burakumin, and was chairman of a cultural association aimed at improving education and cultural awareness in rural areas.

Arima was elected to the House of Representatives in the Diet of Japan in 1924 under the Rikken Seiyūkai party. In 1929, after he succeeded his father to the title of hakushaku (count) under the kazoku peerage system, he was nominated to the House of Peers.

Arima was a close personal friend of Fumimaro Konoe, and when Konoe became Prime Minister of Japan in 1937, Arima was requested to serve as his Minister of Agriculture. He also participated in Konoe's Showa Studies Society "Brain trust".

In 1936, Arima helped organize the Tokyo Senators baseball team, and built a baseball stadium located where the present Korakuen Stadium in Tokyo is now located. Despite pressure from the Japanese military to ban the "western sport" Arima helped sustain it during the war years, and later helped to revive professional baseball in Japan in the postwar period.

In 1940, Arima became head of the Taisei Yokusankai organization, but resigned after five months due to opposition from the militarist faction in the government.

In the post-war period, he was active in promoting horse racing and was one of the founders of the Nakayama Racecourse. He died in 1957 of acute pneumonia. The Arima Kinen horserace was named in his honor.

References

Books

External links
Japan Baseball Hall of Fame

1884 births
1957 deaths
Kazoku
University of Tokyo alumni
Members of the House of Peers (Japan)
Government ministers of Japan
Rikken Seiyūkai politicians
Members of the House of Representatives (Empire of Japan)